The Norwegian Mathematical Society (NMF) is a professional society for mathematicians. It was formed in 1918, with Carl Størmer elected as its first president.
It organizes mathematical contests and the annual  Abel symposium and also awards the Viggo Brun Prize to young Norwegian mathematicians for outstanding research in mathematics, including mathematical aspects of information technology, mathematical physics, numerical analysis, and computational science. The 2018 Prize winner was Rune Gjøringbø Haugseng. 
The NMF is a member of the International Council for Industrial and Applied Mathematics and provides the Norwegian National Committee in the International Mathematical Union.

Past Presidents and Honorary Members

The Society elected two Honorary Members: Carl Størmer (elected 22 February 1949) and Viggo Brun (elected 30 May 1974).

References

External links 
 Official website

Mathematical societies
Education in Norway
Scientific organisations based in Norway
Organizations established in 1918
1918 establishments in Norway
Professional associations based in Norway